FC Nart Cherkessk was a Russian football team from Cherkessk. It was founded in 1982 and played professionally from 1982 to 1998 and from 2002 to 2003. It played on the second-highest level, Russian First Division, in 1992 and 1993.

External links
  History by KLISF

Association football clubs established in 1982
Association football clubs disestablished in 2004
Defunct football clubs in Russia
Sport in Cherkessk
1982 establishments in Russia
2004 disestablishments in Russia